Andy Coen (June 20, 1964 – April 15, 2022) was an American college football coach.  He was the head coach of the Lehigh University Mountain Hawks football team in Bethlehem, Pennsylvania, a position he held from 2006 until 2018.

Coen grew up in Cherry Hill, New Jersey and graduated from Cherry Hill High School East in 1982.

Coen stepped down from his role as the head coach at Lehigh in 2018 after he was diagnosed with early-onset Alzheimer's disease.

Head coaching record

References

External links
 Lehigh profile

1964 births
2022 deaths
James Madison Dukes football coaches
Lehigh Mountain Hawks football coaches
Merchant Marine Mariners football coaches
Minnesota Golden Gophers football coaches
Penn Quakers football coaches
Widener Pride football coaches
Gettysburg College alumni
People from Cherry Hill, New Jersey
Cherry Hill High School East alumni
Coaches of American football from New Jersey
Players of American football from New Jersey
Sportspeople from Camden County, New Jersey